Action in Chains is a 1905 bronze sculpture by Aristide Maillol. The original called Monument to Blanqui was commissioned by Louis Auguste Blanqui, and resides at the Puget-Théniers, for which it was originally commissioned.

Secondary casts and related artworks
Bronze casts (2.15m height) at :
Musée d'Orsay, displayed since 1964 mat Tuileries Garden as part of a series of works by Maillol on open-air display
Caracas Museum of Contemporary Art (1906)
Österreichische Galerie Belvedere
Hirshhorn Museum and Sculpture Garden
Hakone Open-Air Museum
Norton Simon Museum
Private collection (Sale by Dina Vierny, Christie's, 2005);
Billy Rose Collection, Israel Museum

Bronze versions without arms (2.15m height):
Collection Dina Vierny, Paris;
Private collection at city of Perpignan, displayed at Banyuls-sur-Mer.

Bronze torso:
Kunstmuseum Basel
Art Institute of Chicago
Tate Gallery
Metropolitan Museum of Art
City of Perpignan;
Collection Oskar Reinhart, Winterthur;
Private collection.

Other:
Bronze study without arms (33 cm height) at Metropolitan Museum of Art
Charcoal Drawing at Metropolitan Museum of Art
Plaster cast (2.15 m height) at Musée Maillol

References

External links

1900s sculptures
Sculptures of women
Nude sculptures
1905 sculptures
Nude sculptures in France
Sculptures by Aristide Maillol
Bronze sculptures in Paris
Sculptures in Paris
Sculptures in Venezuela